Lee Reynolds may refer to:

Lee Reynolds (theatre producer)
Lee Reynolds, a member of American doo-wop group The Fireflies
Lee Reynolds, a member of British punk rock band The Destructors
Lee Reynolds, a member of American thrash metal band Morbid Saint
Lee Reynolds, a member of British indie rock band Mesh-29
Lee Reynolds, screenwriter for such films as Delta Force 2
Lee Reynolds, actor who played Captain Tugg, host of a children's cartoon show broadcast in the early 1960s
Lee Reynolds, midfielder for Rhydymwyn F.C.
Lee Reynolds, real name of British/Filipino disc jockey DJ eL Reynolds